Crambus bachi is a moth in the family Crambidae. It was described by Graziano Bassi in 2012. It is found in Ethiopia.

References

Endemic fauna of Ethiopia
Crambini
Moths described in 2012
Moths of Africa